Bismarck Memorial Airport  is a city-owned public-use airport located one nautical mile (1.15 mi, 1.85 km) southeast of the central business district of Bismarck, a city in St. Francois County, Missouri, United States.

Facilities and aircraft 
It has one runway designated 17/35 with an asphalt surface measuring 2,050 by 50 feet (625 x 15 m).

For the 12-month period ending April 7, 2008, the airport had 2,910 aircraft operations, an average of 242 per month: 99.7% general aviation and 0.3% military. At that time there were 12 single-engine aircraft based at this airport.

References

External links 
  at MoDOT Airport Directory
 Aerial photo as of 1 March 1996 from USGS The National Map
 

Airports in Missouri
Buildings and structures in St. Francois County, Missouri